The 7th APAN Star Awards ceremony was held on January 23, 2021, at Kyung Hee University Peace Hall, Seoul, and was hosted by Kim Seung-woo. It was broadcast exclusively on online platforms Olleh TV and Seezn. First held in 2012, the annual awards ceremony recognizes the excellence in South Korea's television. Nominees were selected from dramas that aired on free-to-air networks MBC, KBS and SBS and cable channels tvN, JTBC, OCN, MBN and TV Chosun.

Originally set to take place on November 29, 2020, the physical ceremony was indefinitely postponed on November 18, 2020, after Level 1.5 social distancing rules went into effect amid a resurgence of the COVID-19 pandemic in Seoul and surrounding metropolitan areas. On December 17, it was announced that the awards will be held in 2021 on January 24. It was again rescheduled for January 23; it was a two-day integrated event collectively referred to as the APAN MusicStar Awards.

Winners and nominees

Winners are listed first, highlighted in boldface, and indicated with a dagger.
 Nominees

Popularity awards
Nominees in various popularity categories were announced on October 26, 2020. Winners were determined solely by fan voting. Voting began on October 27 via the Idol Champ mobile app and continued until November 27. Voting for the KT Seezn Star category took place on the Seezn app. Winners were announced on November 30.

See also
APAN Music Awards

References

External links
 

APAN
APAN Star Awards
APAN Star Awards